Sir Robert Peter Fawcus KBE CMG (30 September 1915 – 22 April 2003) was a British colonial administrator in Bechuanaland Protectorate.

Educated at Cambridge University, Fawcus was Government Secretary for Bechuanaland from 1954 to 1959, Resident Commissioner of Bechuanaland from 1959 to 1963 and Queen's Commissioner from 1963 to 1965. He prepared the way for Botswana's independence in 1960. 1966.

References
FAWCUS, Sir (Robert) Peter, Who Was Who, A & C Black, 1920–2015; online edn, Oxford University Press, 2014

1915 births
2003 deaths
Commissioners of the Bechuanaland Protectorate
People educated at Charterhouse School
Alumni of Clare College, Cambridge
Knights Commander of the Order of the British Empire
Companions of the Order of St Michael and St George
1960s in Bechuanaland Protectorate